Events from the year 1966 in Pakistan.

Incumbents

Federal government
President: Ayub Khan
Chief Justice: A.R. Cornelius

Events

January
10 January, Pakistan and Republic of India sign   agreement   to   end   hostilities.

February
 Sheikh Mujibur Rahman.  leader of the East Pakistan Awami League,  announced   6 Point Movement calling for limiting the federal government to defence and foreign affairs.

Births
14 September – Aamer Sohail, cricketer.

See also
 1965 in Pakistan
 1967 in Pakistan
 List of Pakistani films of 1966
 Timeline of Pakistani history

 
1966 in Asia